Several sculpted busts of Pope Urban VIII were created by the Italian artist Gianlorenzo Bernini, with varying amounts of assistance from other artists in his workshop:

 Palazzo Barberini, Rome, 1623–1624. Marble.
 San Lorenzo in Fonte, 1626. Marble. Assistance by Giuliano Finelli.
 Galleria Nazionale di Arte, Palazzo Barberini, Rome, 1637–1638. Marble.
 Galleria Nazionale di Arte, Palazzo Barberini, Rome. Early 1640s. Marble. Largely the work of an assistant.
 Louvre, Paris. 1640. Bronze.
 Cathedral of Spoleto, 1642. Bronze.
 Collection Principe Enrico Barberini. Early 1640s. Porphyry. Adapted from existing antique statue, largely by assistants.
 Private Collection (Barberini Family). 1658. Bronze

In 2020, the Galleria Borghese began a fund raising campaign to purchase the last bust on this list from the Barberini family.

See also
List of works by Gian Lorenzo Bernini

Notes

References

External links

17th-century sculptures
Marble sculptures in Italy
Bronze sculptures in Paris
Bronze sculptures in Italy
Stone sculptures
Sculptures of popes
Busts in France
Busts in Italy
Pope Urban VIII